From Dawn Till Sunset  is 1975 Soviet drama film directed by Gavriil  Egiazarov.

Big screen. A cinematic tale about collective farm mechanic, became acutely aware of its responsibility for everything that happens around. From dawn to dusk.

Plot 
Ordinary village house where an old Russian oven peacefully coexists with a gas stove. On the walls of honor, pennant drummer communist labor, photos. Here lives the  zernotok  operator one of the Ural collective farms Fyodor Roznov. Now here comes Rozhnov  in-law, who had just returned, as they say, from places not so remote. He got there because of his wife's eldest Rozhnov's daughter  Nadya. Jealous of it to one person, gave vent to his hands, well. 

Nadezhda is not home  she lives in the city and found there seemed to be their happiness, and the yard runs her six-year-old son Sergei. In-law and father in law to be a difficult conversation.

And in the morning at Rozhnov  care: Harvest, he is the chief inspector of grain on the farm, and on its efficiency depends on the fate of the crop. And the other cares suffice.

Man Fyodor ordinary, nothing outstanding, but for some reason people are drawn to him, go to share their joys and sorrows. Fedor never raise voices, and his word in the family - the law. There is in him kindness, and wisdom, and understanding of another's body. Job Fyodor Vasilyevich bustling, from it depends largely on the harvest, and then it will shut off the electricity, the machine is not enough.

Suddenly, the driver suddenly Valentina's reports on all the current that
television broadcast a program about Fedor: the announcer said that the meeting of the veterans of his regiment.
And wash over him memories of the distant days of the war.

On a dusty dirt road is a column of girls. Along the edges of the column Nazi machine gunners. Girls waiting bondage, slave labor in Germany. In the bushes are our three gunmen. Unequal power, the Nazis several times more.
But suddenly one girl out of the crowd and goes back to his village. There is a beautiful, slim with his head held high.  Halt! — and after a girl beat gunfire.

A moment later, a shot rang out from the bushes, and Roznov teammates rush to the rescue. And remembered that terrible battle, when the roof caved in their position of German tanks and infantry. Commander was killed in the battle and Bagir that covered their retreat to the last bullet. It was he, Bagheera, shall Fyodor's life.

Cast
 Nikolai Pastukhov as Fyodor Vasilevich Roznov
Igor Ledogorov as General Stukovsky
Lyubov Sokolova as Pelagia Ivanovna Rozhnova, Fyodor Roznov's wife
  Yevgenia Sabelnikova  as Valya
Boris Tokarev as  Motya Zakharov
Zhanna Prokhorenko as  Nadya, eldest daughter Feodor Vasilevich Roznov
Boris Ivanov as Savely, a singer in a restaurant 
 Valentina Berezutskaya as  Makarikha
Yevgeny Shutov as Ivanovich
 Valentina Ananina as Roznov's fellow soldiers 
 Roman (Romuald) Vildan  as episode
 Natalya Andrejchenko as Valya, girl in restaurant
 Georgi Georgiou as Georgii Alexandrovich, headwaiter
 Andrey Vertogradov as Anatoly, Nadya Rozhnova's  Groom

Awards
IX All-Union Film Festival — Best Screenplay; Second prize for Best Actor (Nikolai Pastukhov).

References

External links
 
  From Dawn Till Sunset at the KinoPoisk 
  Songs about War Movies 
1970s Russian-language films
1975 films
1975 drama films
Mosfilm films
Soviet drama films
Films set in the Soviet Union